Pine City is an unincorporated community in Morrow County, Oregon, United States.

References

Unincorporated communities in Morrow County, Oregon
Unincorporated communities in Oregon